Elmar Gasimov (born 2 November 1990) is an Azerbaijani judoka, who competes in the -100 kg division. He has competed at the 2012 and 2016 Olympics and won a silver medal in 2016.  He has also won a bronze at the 2017 World Championships, and a silver (2014) and two bronze medals (2012 and 2019) at European level.

He also won a gold medal at the 2009 European Youth Championship in Yerevan, after defeating Lukáš Krpálek in the final. He later lost to Krpálek in the finals of the 2014 European Championships and of the 2016 Olympics.

Gasimov narrowly missed out on a second bronze medal at the 2019 World Championships, losing to Aaron Wolf with 33 seconds left in the bronze medal match.  He began practising judo in 1999.

Biography 
Elmar Gasimov was born on November 2, 1990, in Khirdalan, Azerbaijan. Elmar Gasimov has been doing sports since 2000.

Career 

Elmar Gasimov had his first success in 2007. He won a silver medal at the U-20 Azerbaijan Championship and a bronze medal at the U23 Azerbaijan Championship. In the same year, he was 3rd in the Azerbaijan Championship. In 2008 he already participated in international competitions. Elmar Gasimov placed 7th at the U-20 World Championship. After 1 year, in 2009, Elmar Gasimov became known in Azerbaijan.  He won a gold medal at the European Youth Championship held in Yerevan, the capital of Armenia, and the Azerbaijani National Anthem was played in his honor in Yerevan.

Elmar Gasimov won a gold medal at the Tbilisi and Samsun Grand Prix in 2015, and a bronze medal at the Qingdao, Jeju and Tokyo Grand Prix. In the same year, he represented Azerbaijan at the 1st European Games. At the opening ceremony of these competitions, the flag bearer of Azerbaijan was Elmar Gasimov. Elmar Gasimov 100 kg. Failed in the weight category at the European Games.  lost to Jorge Fonseca of Portugal by ippon in the 1/16 final.

Elmar Gasimov placed 5th at the 2016 European Championships held in Kazan, Russia.

References

External links

 
 
 
 

1990 births
Living people
People from Absheron District
Azerbaijani male judoka
Judoka at the 2012 Summer Olympics
Judoka at the 2016 Summer Olympics
Olympic judoka of Azerbaijan
Olympic silver medalists for Azerbaijan
Olympic medalists in judo
Medalists at the 2016 Summer Olympics
Judoka at the 2015 European Games
Judoka at the 2019 European Games
European Games medalists in judo
European Games bronze medalists for Azerbaijan